Procrica is a genus of moths belonging to the subfamily Tortricinae of the family Tortricidae. The genus was erected by Alexey Diakonoff in 1960.

Species
Procrica agrapha Diakonoff, 1983
Procrica camerunica Razowski, 2002
Procrica diarda Diakonoff, 1983
Procrica dinshona Razowski & Trematerra, 2010
Procrica imitans (Diakonoff, 1947)
Procrica intrepida (Meyrick, 1912)
Procrica mariepskopa Razowski, 2008
Procrica ochrata Razowski, 2002
Procrica ophiograpta (Meyrick, 1932)
Procrica parisii Razowski & Trematerra, 2010
Procrica parva Razowski, 2002
Procrica pilgrima Razowski, 2008
Procrica sanidota (Meyrick, 1912)
Procrica semilutea Diakonoff, 1960

Former species
Procrica ammina Diakonoff, 1983

See also
List of Tortricidae genera

References

 Diakonoff, A. (1960). Verhandelingen der Koninklijke Nederlandse Akademie van Wetenschappen. (2) 53 (2): 96.
 Brown, J. W. (2005). World Catalogue of Insects. 5 Tortricidae.
 Diakonoff, A. (1983). "Tortricidae from the Comoro Islands (Lepidoptera)". Annales de la Société Entomologique de France. 19 (1): 55-68.
 
 Razowski, J. & Trematerra, P. (2010). "Tortricidae (Lepidoptera) from Ethiopia". Journal of Entomological and Acarological Research. Serie II 42 (2): 47–79.

External links
Tortricid.net

Archipini
Tortricidae genera